Irreligion in Spain is a phenomenon that has existed since at least the 17th century. Secularism became relatively popular (although the majority of the society was still very religious) in the late 19th and early 20th centuries, often associated with anti-clericalism and progressive, republican, anarchist or socialist movements.

During the Second Spanish Republic (1931–1936) Spain became a secular state, placing limitations on the activity of the Catholic Church and expelling the church from education. During the Spanish civil war irreligious people were repressed by the Francoist side, while religion was largely persecuted among the republicans.

During the Francoist Spain period (1939–1975) irreligion was not tolerated, following the national-catholic ideology of the regime; Spanish citizens had to be Catholic by law, though this changed after the Second Vatican Council. Irreligious people could not be public workers or express their thoughts openly.

After the Spanish democratic transition (1975–1982), restrictions on irreligion were lifted. In the last decades religious practice has fallen dramatically and irreligion has grown in popularity.

Demographics
According to a 2018 study by the Ferrer i Guàrdia Foundation, 27% of Spanish people are either atheist, agnostic or non-believers, with 49% of 18-24 year olds in one of those categories.
A survey by Centro de Investigaciones Sociológicas in October 2014 showed that 67.8 percent of Spanish people would today describe themselves as Catholic, although only 16.9 percent of Spanish people attend mass at least once a month. 10.8% define themselves as atheist and a further 16.7% as non-believers. In 2008, several reports indicated that as much as 60% of the population of Madrid and its metropolitan area identified as non-religious. According to a 2009 study, the 46% of Spaniards aged 18–24 declare themselves atheist or agnostic. In 2019, a study carried out by the CIS found that 48.9% of Spaniards aged 18–24 declared themselves atheist or agnostic, therefore becoming a majority over those who declared themselves as religious.

In government
The close alliance of Francoist Spain and the Catholic Church is said to have had a considerable amount of influence on the decline of religion in Spain. The prevalence of the Church on the people and the subsequent end of the Spanish State caused the Spanish to detach themselves from Catholicism as political coercion was relaxed. In the 16 years after the transition from a dictatorship to democracy, there was a significant drop in levels of religious practice. According to Miguel and Stanek, there was a 14% decrease in religious practice in Spain in just those 16 years, decreasing at an annual rate of −2.1%.

In 1966 Francoist Spain passed a law that freed other religions from many of their earlier restrictions, although it also reaffirmed the privileges of the Catholic Church. In 1978 the new Constitution confirmed the right of Spaniards to religious freedom and began disestablishing Catholicism as the state religion and declaring that religious liberty for non-Catholics is a government-protected right.

The process of secularization was already clearly recognizable by the end of the eighteenth century. The depth, influence, and continuity of Spain's liberal and democratic traditions are particularly important in trying to understand the values connected with the ideals of tolerance and religious freedom. Seen in this light, it becomes clear why Spain in particular was one of the first countries in the world to introduce women's rights and why the divorce law of the Second Republic (1931–1936) was one of the most progressive ever passed. It is the foundation for today's law on same-sex marriage, which has led to conflict recently.

Although more than 19 out of every 20 Spaniards were baptized Catholics, the secularization process has become more intense both on an institutional level as well as in the everyday lives of the people. It is argued that in return for the subsidy that the Church receives, society receives the social, health, and educational services of tens of thousands of priests and nuns. Instead, a system was set up to allow citizens to delegate up to 10% of their pay check to the church so that it was no longer government funded.

In education
There exists an inverse relationship between the level of education and the social significance of religion. By 1980, a study was conducted that showed the more educated a person was, the more likely he or she was to be irreligious. This is attributed to the Church's new self-restraint in politics. The church began accepting the need for separation of religion and the state.

Organizations

Unión de Ateos y Librepensadores (UAL)

The UAL is a new organization based in Barcelona which promotes atheism and unites atheists within Spain. The first post on their website is dated 11 January 2008, but they do not have information about their founding. The goal of the group is to inform Spanish-speakers who want to know more about atheism and unite those who have already chosen the atheist lifestyle. Their website contains links to atheist books, groups, and articles. The group has scheduled meetings every Thursday. They host events monthly with atheist speakers and writers. Similar local groups also exist within each autonomous community of Spain.

Irreligious public figures

Agnostics
 José Luís Rodríguez Zapatero (1964 – ...), Prime Minister of Spain (2004–2011)
 Manuela Carmena (1944 – ...), former mayor of Madrid
 Javier Bardem (1969 – ...), actor
 Josep-Lluís Carod-Rovira (1952 – ...), vicepresident of the Catalan government (2006–2010) and leader of Republican Left of Catalonia (1996–2008).
 Cristina Cifuentes (1964 – ...), former President of the Community of Madrid
 Rafael Nadal (1986–), Professional tennis player 
 Horacio Vázquez-Rial (1947–2012), writer and journalist
 Bernardo Bonezzi (1964–2012), film music composer

Atheists
 Alejandro Amenábar (1972 – ...), film director, screenwriter and composer
 Luis Buñuel (1900–1983), film director
 Pepe Rubianes (1947–2009); actor and theater director
 Antonia San Juan (1961 – ...), actress, director and screenwriter
 Pío Baroja (1872–1956), writer
 Javier Cercas (1962 – ...), writer
 Najat El Hachmi (1979 – ...), Moroccan – Spanish Catalan-language writer
 Pablo Picasso (1881–1973); painter, sculptor, printmaker, ceramicist, stage designer, poet and playwright
 Pep Guardiola (1971 – ...), professional football manager and former player,
 Ignacio Escolar (1975 – ...), blogger and journalist. He currently leads the digital newspaper eldiario.es and he is also a political analyst in radio and television. He was founder and first director of the newspaper Público
 Pablo Iglesias Posse (1850–1925), founder of the Spanish Socialist Workers' Party (PSOE) and MP for Madrid (1910–1923)
 Ignacio Fernández Toxo (1952 – ...); labor and anti-francoist activist and leader of Comisiones Obreras, the biggest union in Spain
 Pedro Sánchez (1972 – ...), Prime Minister and leader of the PSOE, the largest political party in Spain
 Pablo Iglesias Turrión (1978 – ...), former leader of Podemos, the third biggest political party of the country
 Albert Rivera (1979 – ...), current leader of Citizens, the fourth biggest political party of the country
 Xosé Manuel Beiras (1936 – ...), Galician nationalist thinker and politician. Spokesperson of the BNG (1985–2002), leader of the opposition in the Parliament of Galicia (1997–2002) and spokesperson of Anova-IN (2012 – ...)
 Javier Nart (1947 – ...); journalist and member of the European Parliament for Citizens
 Fernando Alonso (1981–); two-times world champion between 2005 and 2006, driver of Aston Martin.
 Francesc Sunyer i Capdevila (1826–1898); radical republican, militant atheist, mayor of Barcelona (1869) and overseas minister (1873)
 Buenaventura Durruti (1896–1936), anarchist activist
 Francisco Ferrer Guardia (1859–1909), anarchist activist and founder of the Escuela Moderna
 Ricardo Mella (1861–1925); anarchist thinker, journalist and writer
 José Ortega y Gasset (1883–1955), liberal philosopher, and essayist
 George Santayana (1863–1952), Spanish-American philosopher, essayist, poet, and novelist
 Gustavo Bueno (1924–2016), materialist philosopher
 Fernando Savater (1947 – ...), philosopher
 Juan Pinilla (1981 – ...), flamenco singer
 Miss Shangay Lily (1963–2016); drag queen, writer, filmmaker and gay activist

See also 
Religion in Spain

External links 
Ateus de Catalunya
L'Associació Valenciana d'Ateus i Lliurepensadors (AVALL)
Ateos de Madrid
Ateos de Albacete
Asociación de Ateos y Librepensadores de Andalucía
Ateneu Eclèctic I Liberal D'ateus I Agnóstics

References

Religion in Spain
Spain